Ramjerd-e Bala (also Romanized as Ramjerd-e Bālā) is a village in Jowzam Rural District, Dehaj District, Shahr-e Babak County, Kerman Province, Iran. At the 2006 census, its population was 33, in 6 families.

References 

Populated places in Shahr-e Babak County